The Zarzuela Palace is the residence and working offices of the reigning monarch of Spain (King Felipe VI), although the official residence of the Spanish royal family is the Royal Palace of Madrid. The Zarzuela Palace is on the outskirts of Madrid, near the Royal Palace of El Pardo, which accommodates visiting heads of state. The palace is owned by the Spanish government and administered by a state agency named Patrimonio Nacional (National Heritage).

The Zarzuela Palace was the home of King Juan Carlos I from May 1962 until his departure to live abroad, following allegations of financial impropriety, in August 2020.  It has not been announced whether it will remain the home of his wife, Queen Sofía, who did not accompany Juan Carlos abroad. Although King Felipe VI has his office in the palace, he and his family live in the Pabellón del Príncipe on the grounds just east of the Zarzuela Palace.

History
During the 17th century, King Felipe IV of Spain ordered a country palace or hunting lodge to be built at La Zarzuela near Madrid. The name "Zarzuela" is thought to be derived from the word "zarzas" meaning brambles, due to its function as a hunting lodge, meaning that it is situated amongst the brambles of the King's Hunting Grounds.
It was a rectangular, slate-roofed building with two lateral arcades. King Carlos IV had the building altered to adapt it to 18th century fashion, and adorned it with tapestries and porcelain, as well as furniture and his much-loved clocks.

Royal residence

King Juan Carlos I and his wife, Queen Sofía, lived in the palace from their marriage in May 1962 until Juan Carlos' move abroad alone in August 2020. Queen Sofía continued to live in Spain. After the death of the dictator Francisco Franco in November 1975, the King decided not to occupy his Palace of El Pardo, leaving it for foreign state guests, designating the Palacio de la Moncloa as the residence of the President of the Spanish Government, while they remained at the Zarzuela. The Palacio Real (Royal Palace) in the centre of Madrid, the former principal residence of the Spanish monarchs, is the official residence of the King, although it is now used only for state occasions.

During the summer of 2002, King Felipe VI, then Prince of Asturias, moved into a new residence, a  pavillion built within the grounds of the Palace of La Zarzuela.

Opera
The palace theatre was the place of origin of the Spanish genre of musical drama, zarzuela.

References

External links
Official webpage of the Spanish Monarchy

Palaces in Madrid
Royal residences in Spain
Buildings and structures in Fuencarral-El Pardo District, Madrid
El Pardo